Akashdeep Saigal  is an Indian television actor known for his portrayal of Ansh Virani and Eklavya Virani in Kyunki Saas Bhi Kabhi Bahu Thi as well as participating in Bigg Boss 5.

Personal life
Saigal's father and older brother are lawyers. He also has a sister, Madhu Bhatia who lives in Dubai. During his modeling days he dated Madhu Sapre for 6 months, and Shazahn Padamsee for 3 years.
He took the alias 'Sky' as it is how his close friends address him.
He also dated Pooja Bedi for 3 years after they met on Bigg Boss 5

Career
Akash won the Gladrags Manhunt Contestant, supermodel of the year in 1998. The same year he appeared on the 1998 music video for Shweta Shetty's Deewane to Deewane Hain. He started his acting career with the film Pyaar Mein Kabhi Kabhi (1999). He made his debut on small screen with the popular serial Kyunki Saas Bhi Kabhi Bahu Thi on Star Plus. He had participated in the first season of Jhalak Dikhhla Jaa, a dance competition on Sony Entertainment Television channel.

In 2009, he has played the role of the villain in Tamil blockbuster hit Ayan.

Filmography 
 1999 Pyaar Mein Kabhi Kabhi as Ronnie
 2003 Supari as Mushy
 2009 Ayan as Kamalesh (Tamil film)
 2014 Sultanat (Pakistani Film)
 2017 Kavan as Kalyan (Tamil film)

Television

Awards and nominations

References

External links

 

1974 births
Living people
Indian male models
Indian male television actors
Male actors in Hindi cinema
Bigg Boss (Hindi TV series) contestants